The Metropolitan Borough of Westminster was a metropolitan borough in the County of London, England, from 1900 to 1965.

City status
By royal charter dated 29 October 1900, the borough was granted the title City of Westminster. Westminster had originally been created a city and seat of the short-lived Diocese of Westminster in 1541. The diocese was suppressed in 1550, but the area was still known as a "city", although without official sanction.

Arms and motto
The arms of Westminster represent two monarchs, closely associated with the City. Edward the Confessor, who rebuilt the church of St Peter (Westminster Abbey), and Henry VII, who added a chapel, within the Abbey. The portcullis and rose emblems are derived from the Tudor dynasty, from which Westminster first achieved its status; and they appear throughout many public and religious buildings in Westminster, and the portcullis was adopted by the House of Commons. The supporting lions are adopted from the Cecil family, who have had a long association with the borough. The arms were first granted in 1601.

The motto Custodi Civitatem Domine, is translated as O Lord, watch over the City.

The arms can still be seen on the Portland stone parapet of the former Westminster City Hall in St Martin's Place (built in 1890–91 by Robert Walker, replacing an earlier vestry hall). It can also be seen on the entrance to the car park beneath 10 Spring Gardens (home of the British Council) and on Chelsea and Hammersmith Bridges.

Formation and boundaries
It consisted of the area that is now part of the City of Westminster and south of Oxford Street and Bayswater Road.  It included Soho, Mayfair, St. James's, The Strand, Westminster, Pimlico, Belgravia, and Hyde Park.

The borough was formed from eleven civil parishes and extra-parochial places: Close of the Collegiate Church of St Peter, Liberty of the Rolls, Precinct of the Savoy, St Anne Soho, St Clement Danes, St George Hanover Square, St James Piccadilly, St Martin in the Fields, St Mary-le-Strand, St Paul Covent Garden and Westminster St Margaret and St John. These eleven were combined into a single civil parish called City of Westminster, which was conterminous with the metropolitan borough, in 1922.

Previous to the borough's formation it had been administered by five separate local bodies: the Vestry of St George Hanover Square, the Vestry of St Martin in the Fields, Strand District Board of Works, Westminster District Board of Works and the Vestry of Westminster St James. The Close of the Collegiate Church of St Peter had not been under the control of any local authority prior to 1900.

Population and area
The borough covered . The population recorded in the Census was:

Constituent parishes 1801–1899

Metropolitan Borough 1900–1961

Politics

The borough was divided into fourteen wards for elections: Charing Cross, Conduit, Covent Garden, Great Marlborough, Grosvenor, Hamlet of Knightsbridge, Knightsbridge St George's, Pall Mall, Regent, St Anne, St John, St Margaret, Strand and Victoria.

Borough council

Parliament constituency
For elections to Parliament, the borough was divided into three constituencies:
St George's, Hanover Square
Strand
Westminster
In 1918 the borough's representation was reduced to two seats:
Westminster Abbey
Westminster St George's
In 1950 the borough's representation was reduced to half a seat, when it was merged with the City of London:
Cities of London and Westminster

Poor law
The parishes which made up the borough were within the St George's, Strand and Westminster unions. The unions were amalgamated in 1913 to form the City of Westminster Union. The parishes and unions were then abolished in 1922 and replaced with a single City of Westminster parish for poor law purposes. The parish continued to exist until 1965, but ceased to have any role in the administration of the poor law in 1930 when responsibility transferred to the London County Council.

Replacement
It was abolished in 1965 and its area became part of the City of Westminster along with the Metropolitan Borough of Paddington and the Metropolitan Borough of St Marylebone.

References

Further reading

External links
Metropolitan Borough of Westminster at Vision of Britain

Metropolitan boroughs of the County of London
History of the City of Westminster
1900 establishments in the United Kingdom
1965 disestablishments in the United Kingdom
Districts abolished by the London Government Act 1963